Karsibór is an island forming part of the Polish port town of Świnoujście.
 Karsibór, a village on the above island previously called Kaseburg.

Karsibór may also refer to the following villages in Poland:
Karsibór, Świdwin County
Karsibór, Wałcz County